The Complete Studio Albums (1983–2008) is a box set by American singer-songwriter Madonna. It was released by Warner Bros. Records on March 26, 2012, to coincide with the release of her twelfth studio album, MDNA. The eleven-disc box set was released in Europe and Japan, and included all of Madonna's studio albums from the years 1983 to 2008. The album artwork consisted of a collage of the album covers, housed in a gold box. It also included a Parental Advisory sticker due to the original version of the albums Erotica (1992) and American Life (2003). On the same date, Warner Bros. released and reprinted another box set titled Madonna: Original Album Series which included five discs.

After its release, The Complete Studio Albums (1983–2008) received mixed reception from reviewers, who complimented the overall packaging of the box set, but hoped that the record label would have included Madonna's other popular songs that had not been on the original studio albums. The box set charted in multiple nations including Croatia, Finland, France, Italy, Korea, Mexico, Netherlands, Spain, Sweden and United Kingdom. It entered the top-ten of the Japanese Oricon album chart. The same week, MDNA was also present in the top-ten, making Madonna the first female artist from a Western country to have two albums in the chart's top-ten.

Background 
On March 6, 2012, Madonna's official website announced that her former record company, Warner Bros. Records (1982–2009), was to release and reprint the eleven-disc box set. It was released to coincide and on the same date as the 2012 studio album MDNA in the United States. The set includes every previous studio album Madonna had released; the remastered versions of Madonna (1983), Like a Virgin (1984) and True Blue (1986), plus the original versions of Like a Prayer (1989), Erotica (1992), Bedtime Stories (1994), Ray of Light (1998), Music (2000), American Life (2003), Confessions on a Dance Floor (2005) and Hard Candy (2008) with each disc housed in a cardboard sleeve. To complement the release of the box set, iTunes sold every Madonna studio album digitally for £3.95 for a limited time in the UK. On the same day as its release, Warner Bros. released another box set Madonna: Original Album Series which included five discs; the remastered version of True Blue, Like a Prayer, Ray of Light, Music and Confessions on a Dance Floor.

The box set also carries the logos for her other former record companies; Sire Records (1982–1995) and Maverick Records (1992–2004). It is her third greatest hits box set to be released after The Royal Box (1991) which was a limited edition of The Immaculate Collection (1990) and CD Single Collection (1996) which was released exclusively in Japan and included forty 3" CD singles, from "Burning Up" (1983) to "One More Chance" (1996), housed in a deluxe black glossy box.

Critical reception 

Mike Diver from the BBC News gave the box set a positive review, commenting that "this is pop history, a document of the most powerful female force in the music industry as she began her ascent, achieved superstar status, overcame a couple of hiccups, and ultimately landed in the '00s as every fledgling pop idol's ultimate mother figure." He also mentioned the absence of tracks "Into the Groove" (only available on the 1985 reissue of Like a Virgin), "Vogue" (from 1990's I'm Breathless) and "Justify My Love" (from 1990's The Immaculate Collection) may disappoint some fans. Robin Murray from Clash noted that while it traced "the evolution of a pop phenomenon", he felt it needed bonus materials. Andy Kellman from AllMusic was more ambivalent in his reception of the box set, stating that the release is more suitable for "voracious newcomers than longtime followers".

Describing the packaging, Kellman noted that it "was sharp but not elaborate – a clamshell box with each disc packaged in a paper LP-replica sleeve. While the box is a convenient and reasonably priced way to obtain most of Madonna's releases, an investment of that scope should entail all the stray hits from the same era. This really could have used a 12th disc", for adding all the other songs released by Madonna. The BBC described the packaging as a "no-frills affair—CDs are housed in cardboard sleeves that won't stand up to house-party punishment" Clash commented on the packaging more favorably, describing it as "fairly lavish".

Commercial performance 
In the United Kingdom, the box set debuted at number 70 on the UK Albums Chart with sales of 2,055 copies. Madonna's total album sales for the 21st century in the United Kingdom stood at 7,279,423, as of April 2012, making her one of the biggest selling acts of this period. It was certified gold in Poland by the Polish Society of the Phonographic Industry (ZPAV) for shipment of 10,000 copies of the box set. In France, the box set debuted at number 26 with 2,838 units.

In Japan it sold 13,000 copies and debuted at number nine (and MDNA at number four) making Madonna the first international female artist in Japanese chart history to have two albums in the top ten simultaneously and the first international artist in 20 years to achieve such feat, after Bruce Springsteen, who occupied two simultaneous top-ten albums in 1992 with Human Touch and Lucky Town. With this feat, Madonna has accumulated 22 top-ten albums in Japan, more than any other international artist. On the South Korean International chart, it debuted and peaked at number 81, selling around 200 copies.

Track listing 
The box set consists of Madonna's first eleven studio albums, from her career with Warner Bros. Records (1982–2009) and its divisions Sire Records (1982–1995) and Maverick Records (1992–2003).

 Notes
  signifies a co-producer
  signifies an additional producer
  signifies an additional producer and remixer

Charts, sales and certification

Weekly charts

Year-end charts

Certifications and sales

Release history

References

External links 

2012 compilation albums
Madonna compilation albums
Warner Records compilation albums